Varkbar-e Olya (also Romanized as Varkbār-e ‘Olyā; also known as Varkbār and Warkbār) is a village in Kuhpayeh Rural District, Nowbaran District, Saveh County, Markazi Province, Iran. At the 2006 census, its population was 92, in 34 families.

References 

Populated places in Saveh County